Svetlana Vladimirovna Saykina (née Ivanova born 10 July 1985) is a Russian discus thrower.

International competitions

References

1985 births
Living people
Russian female discus throwers
Olympic female discus throwers
Olympic athletes of Russia
Athletes (track and field) at the 2008 Summer Olympics
Athletes (track and field) at the 2012 Summer Olympics
Universiade medalists in athletics (track and field)
Universiade bronze medalists for Russia
Medalists at the 2011 Summer Universiade
Competitors at the 2005 Summer Universiade
Competitors at the 2007 Summer Universiade
World Athletics Championships athletes for Russia
Russian Athletics Championships winners